Masmaram is a 1997 Indian Malayalam film, directed by Thampi Kannanthanam, starring Suresh Gopi and Aparna Rao in the lead roles. The film was dubbed into Telugu as Sathru Vamsam.

Plot
It is a story of corporate rivalry of two textile tycoons—one who attempts to modernize and gain market share, and one who attempts to use any sorts of evil-doing and make money. The injustice in-between brings forth a lot of unaccountable evil deeds, and for all of it Gautham holds the evil-doer accountable with his life.

Cast
 Suresh Gopi as Gautham Vishwanath
 Arpana Rao as Priyadarshini Das, Darshan Das' daughter
 Rajan P. Dev as Willson Moriz
 Kitty as Darshan Das
 Vijaya Kumar as Jerry, Moriz's son
 Krishna Kumar as ASP Vishnu IPS, (SI Jayamani's son)
 Devan as Munna Bhaai
 Srividya as Mariya Moriz
 Ruthika Singh as Sherin, Moriz's daughter
 T. R. Omana as Darshan Das' mother
 Maniyanpilla Raju as Krishnanunni	
 Sathaar as Mahadevan
 Jyothi Meena as Jenny, Moriz's clerk and girlfriend
 Hemanth Ravan as Hemanth
 Kollam Ajith as SI Jayamani
 Abitha as Jasmine, Munna Bhai's daughter
 Prathapachandran as Justice Ramanathan
 N. F. Varghese as Viswanathan
 Jayashree as Madhavi, Vishwanathan's wife
 Vallathol Unnikrishnan as Moriz's secretary

References

External links

1997 films
1990s Malayalam-language films
Films directed by Thampi Kannanthanam